Jacques "Jacky" Boxberger (16 April 1949 – 9 August 2001) was a track and field athlete from France who specialized in long-distance races.

He was the great hope of French middle distance running, breaking the junior world record in the 1500 metres at Stade Charléty in 1968.  He represented France at the 1968, 1972, 1976 and 1984 Summer Olympics, placing sixth in the 1968 1500 metres and 42nd in the 1984 marathon.  He also won the Paris Marathon in 1983 and 1985, the 1500 metres title at the 1972 European Athletics Indoor Championships, the Marrakech Marathon in 1987 and French titles in the 1500 metres, 5000 metres and 10000 metres.  A knee injury during his military service with the Joinville battalion prevented him from achieving a career as brilliant as that of Michel Jazy.

It finished third of the Cross country World Championships by Teams in 1976. 

In 2001, Boxberger was on vacation with his family in Kenya. While he was trying to film an elephant on a safari, the animal picked up Boxberger with its trunk, threw him against a tree and trampled him to death.

The middle distance runner, Ophélie Claude-Boxberger, is his daughter.

References

External links

1949 births
2001 deaths
French male long-distance runners
French male marathon runners
Accidental deaths in Kenya
Athletes (track and field) at the 1968 Summer Olympics
Athletes (track and field) at the 1972 Summer Olympics
Athletes (track and field) at the 1976 Summer Olympics
Athletes (track and field) at the 1984 Summer Olympics
Deaths due to elephant attacks
Olympic athletes of France
Sportspeople from Vosges (department)
Paris Marathon male winners
20th-century French people
21st-century French people